Overtreated - Why too much Medicine is Making us Sicker and Poorer is a 2007 book by Shannon Brownlee about unnecessary health care.

Reviews
The reviewer for The New York Times said that the book was "the best description I have yet read of a huge economic problem that we know how to solve—but is so often misunderstood". Kirkus Reviews described the work as "A bombshell of a book: must reading for consumers, their political representatives and all those White House contenders". The reviewer for The Christian Science Monitor said that the author's conclusions in the book were "fascinating, counterintuitive, and potentially revolutionary". A reviewer writing in a social work journal found the book's findings "insightful" and the examples given as "poignant".

The book was reviewed in JAMA: The Journal of the American Medical Association by Norton Hadler, who praised the arguments made, but criticized their quality and the lack of reliance on primary sources. Shannon Doyle in American Journal of Medical Quality similarly praised the timeliness of the book and the detailed arguments, but noted that it the issue is not framed in a political context. In Nursing Ethics , Clair Kaplannotes the extensive use of data in arguments, but was disappointed by the lack of information about nursing.

References

Further reading
interview with author on The Health Care Blog
book review on the Healthcare Economist blog
Are Today's Hospital Patients 'Overtreated'? NPR interview of author about book by Ira Flatow
video interview by National Institutes of Health
video interview with Shannon Brownlee about Overtreated on C-SPAN
video on book and author by BMJ

2007 non-fiction books
Books about health care
Unnecessary health care
Bloomsbury Publishing books